The angled tiger (Parantica garamantis) is a species of nymphalid butterfly in the Danainae subfamily. It is found in Papua New Guinea and the Solomon Islands.

References

Parantica
Butterflies described in 1888
Taxa named by Frederick DuCane Godman
Taxa named by Osbert Salvin
Taxonomy articles created by Polbot